The 1876 United States presidential election in Minnesota took place on November 7, 1876, as part of the 1876 United States presidential election. Voters chose five representatives, or electors to the Electoral College, who voted for president and vice president.

Minnesota voted for the Republican nominee, Rutherford B. Hayes, over the Democratic nominee, Samuel J. Tilden. Hayes won the state by a margin of 19.64%.

With 58.80% of the popular vote, Minnesota was Hayes' fifth strongest victory by percentage of the popular vote, after Vermont, Nebraska, Kansas and Rhode Island.

Results

See also
 United States presidential elections in Minnesota

References

Minnesota
1876
1876 Minnesota elections